Matthew 13:3 is the third verse in the thirteenth chapter of the Gospel of Matthew in the New Testament.

Content
In the original Greek according to Westcott-Hort, this verse is:
Καὶ ἐλάλησεν αὐτοῖς πολλὰ ἐν παραβολαῖς, λέγων, Ἰδού, ἐξῆλθεν ὁ σπείρων τοῦ σπείρειν.  

In the King James Version of the Bible the text reads:
And he spake many things unto them in parables, saying, Behold, a sower went forth to sow;

The New International Version translates the passage as:
Then he told them many things in parables, saying: "A farmer went out to sow his seed".

Analysis
Here the gospel doctrine is compared to seed, and the harvest proceeding from it. Just as with a natural harvest there is need of seed, earth, sun, rain and wind, so also in the spiritual harvest. The seed is the word of God, or the gospel.

Commentary from the Church Fathers
Chrysostom: "He had not done thus on the mount; He had not framed His discourse by parables. For there were the multitudes only, and a mixed crowd, but here the Scribes and Pharisees. But He speaks in parables not for this reason only, but to make His sayings plainer, and fix them more fully in the memory, by bringing things before the eyes."

Jerome: "And it is to be noted, that He spake not all things to them in parables, but many things, for had He spoken all things in parables, the people would have departed without benefit. He mingles things plain with things dark, that by those things which they understand they may be incited to get knowledge of the things they understand not. The multitude also is not of one opinion, but of divers wills in divers matters, whence He speaks to them in many parables, that each according to their several dispositions may receive some portion of His teaching."

Chrysostom: "He first sets forth a parable to make His hearers more attentive, and because He was about to speak enigmatically, He attracts the attention by this first parable, saying, Behold, a sower went forth to sow his seed."

Jerome: "By this sower is typified the Son of God, who sows among the people the word of the Father."

Chrysostom: "Whence then went out He who is every where present, and how went He out? Not in place; but by His incarnation being brought nearer to us by the garb of the flesh. Forasmuch as we because of our sins could not enter in unto Him, He therefore came forth to us."

Rabanus Maurus: "Or, He went forth, when having left Judea, He passed by the Apostles to the Gentiles."

Jerome: "Or, He was within while He was yet in the house, and spake sacraments to His disciples. He went therefore forth from the house, that He might sow seed among the multitudes."

Chrysostom: "When you hear the words, the sower went out to sow, do not suppose that is a tautology. For the sower goes out oftentimes for other ends; as, to break up the ground, to pluck up noxious weeds, to root up thorns, or perform any other species of industry, but this man went forth to sow. What then becomes of that seed? three parts of it perish, and one is preserved; but not all in the same manner, but with a certain difference, as it follows, And as he sowed, some fell by the wayside."

References

External links
Other translations of Matthew 13:3 at BibleHub

13:3